Poire Williams is the name for eau de vie (colorless fruit brandy) made from the Williams pear (also known as Williams' bon chrétien and as the Bartlett pear in the United States, Canada and Australia) in France and Switzerland. It is generally served chilled as an after-dinner drink. Some producers of Poire Williams include an entire pear inside each bottle, called prisonnière. This is achieved by attaching the bottle to a budding pear tree so that the pear will grow inside it.

Since 2001, Eau-de-vie de poire du Valais produced in the Canton of Valais, Switzerland has been protected as an Appellation d'origine protégée.

References

External links
 Okanagan Spirits Poire Williams Pear Brandy made in BC Canada " Sip the Waters of Life" (National Post)
 The AOP designation in Switzerland

Fruit brandies